Love Is Gonna Getcha is the eighth studio album by American singer Patti Austin, released in 1990, and recorded for the GRP label. The album reached No. 4 on Billboard Jazz chart.

Track listing
"Through the Test of Time" (David Pack, Jeff Pescetto) – 5:05
"Too Soon to Know" (David Pack, Lorraine Feather, Michael McDonald) – 4:21
"In My Life" (Patti Austin) – 4:02
"Love Is Gonna Getcha" (Lou Pardini, Reed Vertelney, Alan Roy) – 4:59
"Ooh-Whee (The Carnival)" (Don Grusin, Patti Austin) – 5:40
"Believe the Children" (Abraham Laboriel, Lynn Laboriel, Lou Pardini) – 5:34
"Good in Love" (Jeff Southworth, Fran Eckert, Robin Batteau) – 4:37
"Wait for Me" (Don Grusin, Kate Markowitz, Christina Trulio) – 5:25
"First Time Love" (Dave Grusin, Harvey Mason) – 5:30
"In My Dream" (Edward Arkin, Beckie Foster) – 5:07
"The Girl Who Used to Be Me" (Marvin Hamlisch, Alan Bergman, Marilyn Bergman) – 4:15

Personnel 
 Patti Austin – lead vocals, BGV arrangements (1, 4–8, 10), backing vocals (2, 5, 7, 8, 10)
 Dave Grusin – rhythm arrangements (1–10), synthesizers (1, 3, 4, 6, 9), keyboards (2, 5, 7, 8, 10), acoustic piano (3, 9), string arrangements (3, 9, 10), BGV arrangements (5, 6, 8, 10), harmonica (8)
 Greg Phillinganes – acoustic piano (1, 4, 6)
 David Paich – keyboards (11), synthesizers (11), arrangements (11)
 Steve Porcaro – synthesizers (11)
 Lee Ritenour – guitars (1, 2, 4, 5, 7, 8, 9)
 Michael Landau – guitars (11)
 Nathan East – bass (1, 3, 4, 6, 8, 9, 10)
 Neil Stubenhaus – bass (2, 5, 7)
 Harvey Mason – drums (1–10)
 Jeff Porcaro – drums (11)
 Michael Fisher – percussion (3, 5, 6, 10)
 Paulinho da Costa – percussion (8)
 Lenny Castro – percussion (11)
 Ernie Watts – tenor saxophone (1)
 Nelson Rangell – alto saxophone (4)
 David Pack – BGV arrangements (2)
 Robin Beck – backing vocals (1, 4, 6, 7)
 Shelton Becton – backing vocals (1, 6)
 Jocelyn Brown – backing vocals (1, 4, 6, 7)
 Rachele Cappelli – backing vocals (1, 4, 6, 7)
 William Eaton – backing vocals (1, 6)
 Lani Groves – backing vocals (1, 2, 4, 6, 7)
 James D-Train Williams – backing vocals (1, 4, 6)
 Casey Sissik – backing vocals (2, 7)

Strings (3, 9, 10)
 David Nadien – concertmaster
 Charles McCracken and Richard Locker – cello
 Deborah Henson-Conant – harp
 Jean R. Dane, Carol Landon and Sue Pray – viola
 Elena Barere, Arnold Eidus, Barry Finclair, Regis Iandiorio, Charles Libove, Louann Montesi, David Nadien, John Pintavalle, Matthew Raimondi, Richard Sortomme, Marti Sweet and Gerald Tarack – violin

Production 
 Producers – Dave Grusin (Tracks 1–10); David Paich (Track 11).
 Executive Producers – Dave Grusin and Larry Rosen
 Production Assistant – Barbara Hein
 Recorded and Mixed by Don Murray 
 Recording Assistants – Matthew "Boomer" LaMonica, Joe Martin and Brian Soucy.
 Additional Recording – Bill Cooper, Ed Rak, Matthew "Boomer" LaMonica and Joe Martin.
 Mix Assistant – Elaine Anderson 
 Recorded at Sunset Sound (Hollywood, CA); American Recording Co. (Calabasas, CA); Clinton Recording Studio and The Power Station (New York, NY).
 Mixed at Smoketree Ranch (Chatsworth, CA).
 Digital Editing by Mike Landy and Robert Vosgien at CMS Digital (Pasadena, CA) and The Review Room (New York, NY).
 Mastered by Wally Traugott at Capitol Studios (Hollywood, CA).
 Graphic Design – David Gibb, Jackie McCarthy, Andy Ruggirello and Dan Serrano.
 Photography – Richard Corman

Charts

References

External links
Love Is Gonna Getcha at Discogs
Love Is Gonna Getcha at All Music
Patti Austin's Official Site

1990 albums
Patti Austin albums
Albums produced by Dave Grusin 
GRP Records albums